Chineh Hukerd (also Romanized as Chīneh Hūkerd) is a village in Khatunabad Rural District, in the Central District of Jiroft County, Kerman Province, Iran. At the 2006 census, its population was 182, in 39 families.

References 

Populated places in Jiroft County